The BET Award for Best Group is given to the overall best R&B, hip hop, or gospel group who has released an album the previous or same year. When the award was first given, it awarded male and female groups separately. It was combined the following year. Migos are the all-time winners in this category with four wins and have received the most nominations with seven.

Winners and nominees
Winners are listed first and highlighted in bold.

2000s

2010s

2020s

Multiple wins and nominations

Wins

 4 wins
 Migos

 3 wins
 Outkast

 2 wins
 Destiny's Child
 Silk Sonic
 Young Money

Nominations

 7 nominations
 Migos

 5 nominations
 Chloe x Halle
 Mary Mary

 4 nominations
 City Girls
 Destiny's Child
 Rae Sremmurd
 Outkast

 3 nominations
 112
 Diddy – Dirty Money
 Floetry
 Jagged Edge
 The Roots
 Three 6 Mafia
 Young Money

 2 nominations
 A$AP Mob
 A Tribe Called Quest
 B2K
 The Black Eyed Peas
 Clipse
 Day26
 Drake and Future
 Fat Joe
 Gnarls Barkley
 Lil Baby
 Lil' Jon & The Eastside Boyz
 N.E.R.D.
 New Boyz
 Macklemore and Ryan Lewis
 Mindless Behavior
 Silk Sonic
 The Throne

References

BET Awards